Paul Anthony Lambert (born March 9, 1970), an Alabama native, is best known as "Engineer Ed" in the children's television show, "Fun Junction Depot". Currently, he works as technology consultant and small business owner, specializing in mobile television production.

Lambert, who resides in Maylene, AL, is married to Tracy Sanders Lambert, of Birmingham, Alabama, and is the father of twelve children.

Lambert has announced his plans to run  in the 2010 election cycle for Alabama's 6th congressional district, US House of Representatives, against incumbent Spencer Bachus.

Personal life

Born and raised in Birmingham, Alabama, Lambert is the oldest child of Phillip Lambert and Opal Blackmon Lambert. He has one sibling, a younger brother, Dennis Lambert.

Lambert served as an adult volunteer for the Boy Scouts of America, holding multiple leadership positions. As a leader in Cub Scout Pack 72 and later Cub Scout Pack 007, he served as Cub Master, Assistant Cub Master, Tiger Cub Coach, Wolf Den Leader, Bear Den Leader, Pack Trainer, and Advancement Chair.  On the district level, he served on the Shelby District Round Table Staff and as Shelby District Popcorn Sale Chairman. In 2002, Lambert received the Shelby District Award of Merit for his years of service to Cub Scouting.

Lambert also created and developed the "Closer to Him" Bible study for mid-week children's ministry programs.

Professional life

Paul received his degree in Electronic Engineering with emphasis in computers and telecommunications in 1991. Additional credentials include Certified Technician—The National Association of Radio and Telecommunications Engineers, Inc., and Certified Fiber Optic Technician.

Lambert worked as a broadcast engineer for a Birmingham, AL based television post-production facility from 1993 to 2003 and as an Electronics Instructor at Virginia College of Birmingham from 1995 to 1998.

Lambert now owns a technology consulting firm, Paul Lambert Consulting and Solutions, located in Shelby County, Alabama.

Political aspirations

In April 2009, Lambert announced his candidacy to run as a Republican for Alabama's Sixth Congressional District seat in the United States House of Representatives against nine-term incumbent Republican Spencer Bachus.

References

External links
Paul Lambert for Congress 2010

Alabama Republicans
Male actors from Birmingham, Alabama
1970 births
Living people
Activists from Birmingham, Alabama